Michael Samuel Wallace (born March 10, 1959) is an American professional stock car racing driver. He last competed part-time in the NASCAR Xfinity Series, driving the No. 0 Chevrolet Camaro for JD Motorsports. Born in Fenton, Missouri, he is the younger brother of Rusty Wallace, older brother of Kenny Wallace, and uncle of Steve Wallace. His daughter, Chrissy Wallace, and son, Matt Wallace, are also active in racing competition.

Racing career

Early NASCAR career
Wallace made his Busch Series debut in 1990 at the season-closing Winston Classic at Martinsville Speedway. Starting 24th, Wallace finished sixth in the No. 40 Lowes Foods-sponsored Chevrolet. The next season, he ran nine Busch races for a variety of different teams, and had a third-place finish at Lanier Raceway. He also made his Winston Cup debut at the Pyroil 500, where he finished 31st in the Jimmy Means-owned car. It also marked the first time since the 1950s that three brothers competed against each other in a Winston Cup race, as Rusty and Kenny drove in that race also.

In 1992, Wallace signed on with Moroso Racing to pilot the No. 20 First Ade-sponsored Oldsmobile. They also ran a Cup race together at Atlanta Motor Speedway, where Wallace finished thirty-third. Despite a tenth-place run at Martinsville, Wallace was dismissed from the ride nearly half-way into the season. Late in the year, he was hired by Barry Owen to drive his No. 9 Oldsmobile, replacing the late Clifford Allison. After a ninth-place finish in their first race at Dover International Speedway, Wallace posted a second-place finish at Martinsville. Wallace and Owen also ran a pair of Cup races, their best finish a 20th at Atlanta. They ran the entire Busch schedule in 1993, with sponsorship from FDP Brakes. Wallace had nine Top 10’s that season finished a career-high 12th in the final points standings. He also finished in the Top 15 in the first time in his Cup career when he finished 15th at Atlanta.

1994–1997

Early in 1994, Wallace was hired by Junie Donlavey to drive his No. 90 Heilig-Meyers-sponsored Ford Thunderbird in the Winston Cup Series. Although he competed in 22 of the scheduled 31 races that year, Wallace finished fifth in the Rookie of the Year standings and 33rd in the final point standings. His season was capped off with a fifth-place finish at the Hooters 500. In the Busch Series, he won his first career race at Dover, followed by victories at The Milwaukee Mile and Indianapolis Raceway Park. The following season, Wallace failed to qualify for five races in the Cup series and dropped a spot in the standings. His lone lead-lap finish came at Bristol Motor Speedway, where he finished ninth. In the Busch Series, his team switched to No. 90 with a sponsorship from Duron Paints, and posted two second-place finishes. He also made his Craftsman Truck Series debut that season at North Wilkesboro Speedway, and finished 29th in the MB Motorsports truck.

Twelve races into the 1996 season, Wallace was released from his Cup ride with Donlavey. Despite moving back down into the Busch Series full-time, Wallace only posted one top ten in the second half of the season, forcing Owen's team to close its doors. Wallace began 1997 with high hopes in the No. 91 LJ Racing Chevrolet Monte Carlo owned by Joe Falk and Ron Neal. The team had moved up from the Busch Series and signed Spam as a full-time sponsor but after many DNQ's and the best finish of 17th at Texas Motor Speedway, the team lost its sponsor and Wallace found himself without a ride. He also split time in the Busch Series in the No. 7 Chevrolet for Ed Whitaker, making six starts. Midway through the season, he left for the Truck series, driving the No. 52 Purolator-sponsored Chevrolet Silverado for Ken Schrader Racing. Despite only running 15 races that season, he finished 23rd in points. He also finished in the Top 10 in each of the last four races of the season, including California Speedway, where he finished second.

1998–2004
Wallace returned to run the Truck Series full-time in 1998 for Schrader. Although he did not win that season, he won his first career NASCAR pole at New Hampshire International Speedway and had seven top tens en route to a 15th-place point finish. He also ran six Busch races for Andy Petree Racing, Washington-Erving Motorsports, and the Curb Agajanian Performance Group, his best finish coming at IRP for Petree. In addition, he ran the Daytona 500 in an entry for Phil Barkdoll, starting and finishing 23rd.

In 1999, he left Schrader to drive the No. 2 Team ASE Racing Ford F-150 for Ultra Motorsports. He won in his first race for Ultra at Homestead-Miami Speedway, and won again six races later at Pikes Peak International Raceway. He finished sixth in points that year. He also returned to Donlavey in Cup to run the Daytona 500 for him, and finished 23rd, as well finishing 24th in an Ultra-owned car at Richmond International Raceway. The following year, Wallace won an additional two truck races and moved up to fourth in points. He also ran eight Busch races for Moy Racing, his best finish a fourteenth at IRP.

Ultra promoted Wallace back to the Cup Series for 2001 after Michael Waltrip left the team to drive for Dale Earnhardt, Inc., placing him in the #7 NationsRent-sponsored Ford. Despite starting off the season with a sixth-place finish at the Daytona 500, the team struggled in qualifying. Wallace did not qualify for the Coca-Cola 600 or the spring race at Michigan and was pulled from the ride for Ted Musgrave at Pocono in June and Robby Gordon the next week at Sonoma. Despite recording another Top 10 at Daytona in the Pepsi 400 and one more at New Hampshire, he failed to qualify again at Indianapolis and Watkins Glen. 

During that time, he began running with a new Busch Series team, Biagi Brothers Racing, running their No. 4 Geico-sponsored Chevy. His best finish of eight starts was a tenth at Richmond International Raceway. 

After the inaugural race at Kansas in the fall, Wallace left Ultra and joined Penske-Kranefuss Racing, driving the No. 12 Mobil 1-sponsored Ford Taurus as a teammate to his brother Rusty after Jeremy Mayfield was fired. At Phoenix, he led 45 laps late in the race before giving the lead up to Jeff Burton, finishing a career-best second. Wallace recorded four top twenty finishes in the #12, but after the season Roger Penske and Michael Kranefuss elected to dissolve their partnership. Although Penske would continue to run two teams, as rookie Ryan Newman would be promoted to full-time for 2002, he would be doing so under his own team and thus Wallace was left without a ride when the partnership dissolved. 

Andy Petree brought Wallace in to run a few races in his #33 Chevrolet as a replacement for Joe Nemechek, who had left to join Haas-Carter Motorsports. The team did not have sponsorship, however, since Oakwood Homes left the team at the end of 2001, and thus Wallace did not run the full season. However, by virtue of Nemechek’s victory in the fall race at Rockingham the year before, Wallace qualified to race in The Winston all-star race at Charlotte in the #33; he finished 23rd. 

He returned to run with Biagi for seventeen races in the Busch Series, posting two consecutive fourteenth-place finishes. Wallace also returned to the Truck series driving the Federated Auto Parts-sponsored truck for Schrader, posting two Top 10’s. Mid-season, he signed onto the No. 14 Conseco-sponsored Pontiac Grand Prix for A. J. Foyt Racing, his best finish a tenth at Bristol.

In 2003, Biagi Bros. began racing full-time in the Busch Series with Wallace. Despite missing two races, Wallace had three Top 10’s and finished 13th in the final standings. In the Cup series, he had two Top 10’s driving for Phoenix, as well as making eight starts filling for Jerry Nadeau in the No. 01 U.S. Army-sponsored Pontiac Grand Prix for MB2/MBV Motorsports. In addition to running two races for Schrader in the Truck Series, he also competed in a pair of events for Brevak Racing, his best finish fifteenth at Phoenix. In 2004, at the mid-season race at Daytona, Wallace took the lead on the last lap and won his fourth career race, the first for Biagi in one of the biggest wins of his career. The following week at Chicagoland Speedway, he led 18 laps and almost won before running out of fuel on the final lap. In the Cup Series, he drove three races for Arnold Motorsports, before leading 45 laps and finishing seventh at Richmond for Phoenix. He finished the season driving the No. 4 Lucas Oil-sponsored Chevy for Morgan-McClure Motorsports.

2005–present

Wallace began driving for MMM full-time in 2005. Despite an eighth-place finish at the Pepsi 400, Wallace was released towards the end of the season by MMM. He returned to the Truck Series briefly for Darrell Waltrip Motorsports, finishing in the Top 9 twice. He drove for a variety of different teams in the Busch Series, among them Akins Motorsports, Rusty Wallace, Inc. and Evernham Motorsports, with whom he finished second at his hometown track in Gateway.

He began 2006 in the Truck Series running for HT Motorsports but was released after finishing thirty-first in each of his first two starts. Already signed on to run Phoenix's Cup car, Miccosukee Resorts Dodge signed Wallace to be their full-time driver for the remainder of 2006 to replace Jason Keller and had three Top 5 finishes. In 2007, Wallace piloted the No. 7 GEICO-sponsored Chevrolet for Phoenix Racing with teammate J. J. Yeley. Despite no Top 10 finishes, he ended the season 11th in points.

Wallace finished fourth in the 2007 Daytona 500, his best finish in the event.

In 2008, Wallace, GEICO, and his car number moved from Phoenix Racing to Germain Racing, where he drove a Toyota Camry. He had eight Top 10’s and finished a career best eight in points. After he did not renew his contract with Germain, Wallace attempted the 2009 Daytona 500 for Kevin Buckler but failed to make the race by just one position in his Gatorade Duel qualifying race. In June 2009, Larry Gunselman tapped Wallace for a ride in his No. 64 Toyota to compete in Pocono just days after Todd Bodine left the team. On October 31, 2009, in the Mountain Dew 250, he raced the No. 48 for Fast Track Racing Enterprises in the Camping World Truck Series along with his daughter Chrissy Wallace. It was the first time that a father and daughter raced in the same race. Wallace finished 28th after an accident and Chrissy finished 13th. He also signed on as a full-time driver of the No. 01 JD Motorsports in the Nationwide Series.

Wallace led late in the 2011 Aaron's 312 but flipped in a multi-car accident. Wallace drove the car back to pit road and was credited with an 18th-place finish. Near the end of the 2011 season, Wallace won the NCWTS Coca-Cola 250 at Talladega Superspeedway after being pushed by Ron Hornaday for the majority of the race.

He attempted to qualify for the 2012 Daytona 500 in the No. 37 Ford, fielded by Max Q Motorsports and Rick Ware Racing, but failed to qualify for the race.

Wallace drove for JD Motorsports in the Nationwide Series full-time during the 2013 season.

In 2014, Wallace drove part-time for JGL Racing in the Nationwide Series. He also returned to Sprint Cup, driving for Identity Ventures Racing in several late-season Cup events, with a best finish of 26th.

Wallace began 2015 driving for Premium Motorsports in the No. 66 Sprint Cup car. He began the season by finishing 36th in the Daytona 500. However, after failing to qualify for the next two races he was released. Wallace then had triple-bypass heart surgery in April, keeping him out of racing for the summer.

Five years after his last NASCAR national series start, Wallace returned to the Xfinity Series in July 2020 for the Pennzoil 150 on the Indianapolis Motor Speedway road course, racing for JD Motorsports. After starting 14th, his momentum was hindered at the start of the final stage when he stopped to avoid a spinning Brett Moffitt; Wallace finished 24th. He returned to JD at Road America and the Daytona road course in August. On September 10, Wallace was suspended indefinitely by NASCAR for violating the sport's behavioral policy over a social media post. NASCAR did not disclose what Wallace's social media post was the cause of his suspension. He filed two appeals; both of which were rejected by the National Motorsports Appeal Panel. He, alongside Josh Reaume, was reinstated on March 31, 2021.

Motorsports career results

NASCAR
(key) (Bold – Pole position awarded by qualifying time. Italics – Pole position earned by points standings or practice time. * – Most laps led.)

Sprint Cup Series

Daytona 500

Xfinity Series

Camping World Truck Series

 Season still in progress
 Ineligible for series points

ARCA Re/Max Series
(key) (Bold – Pole position awarded by qualifying time. Italics – Pole position earned by points standings or practice time. * – Most laps led.)

Images

References

External links

 
 
 

Living people
1959 births
Sportspeople from St. Louis County, Missouri
Racing drivers from Missouri
Racing drivers from St. Louis
NASCAR drivers
American Speed Association drivers
Wallace family
NASCAR controversies
ARCA Menards Series drivers
Team Penske drivers
Evernham Motorsports drivers
Robert Yates Racing drivers
Richard Childress Racing drivers
A. J. Foyt Enterprises drivers